Robert Edward Latta  (born April 18, 1956) is an American politician who is the United States representative for , serving since 2007. He is a member of the Republican Party. The district includes many of Toledo's suburbs, as well as Findlay, Bowling Green, Napoleon, Sylvania, Defiance and Van Wert. It also includes a sliver of Toledo itself.

Early life, education and career
Born in Bluffton, Ohio, Latta earned his B.A. at Bowling Green State University in 1978 and his J.D. at the University of Toledo College of Law in 1981. Latta was inducted into Omicron Delta Kappa in 1995 as an alumnus of Bowling Green State University. His father, Del Latta, represented the 5th from 1959 to 1989 and served as ranking Republican on the House Budget Committee from 1975 to his retirement. Latta worked as a private practice attorney before entering politics.

Ohio political career
Latta served as a Wood County Commissioner from 1991 to 1996. He then represented the 2nd Senate District in the Ohio Senate from 1997 to 2001 and the 6th house district in the Ohio House of Representatives from 2001 to 2007.

U.S. House of Representatives

Elections 
In 2018, the Conservative Review gave him a 58% rating. Americans for Prosperity has given him a lifetime rating of 90%. In 2017, the Campaign for Working Families gave him a rating of 100%. In 2017, the John Birch Society gave him a Freedom Index rating of 60%. The American Conservative Union has given him a lifetime rating of 91%.

Tenure
On July 22, 2014, Latta introduced a bill that would direct the Federal Communications Commission (FCC) to allow manufacturers of electronic devices with a screen to display information required by the agency digitally on the screen rather than on a label affixed to the device.

In 2015, Latta cosponsored a resolution to amend the Constitution to ban same-sex marriage.

In December 2020, Latta was one of 126 Republican members of the House of Representatives to sign an amicus brief in support of Texas v. Pennsylvania, a lawsuit filed at the United States Supreme Court contesting the results of the 2020 presidential election, in which Joe Biden defeated incumbent Donald Trump. The Supreme Court declined to hear the case on the basis that Texas lacked standing under Article III of the Constitution to challenge the results of an election held by another state.

On May 19, 2021, Latta voted against establishing an independent commission to investigate the storming of the U.S. Capitol. In 2021, he introduced legislation to prohibit municipalities from building their own broadband networks.

Committee assignments 
 Committee on Energy and Commerce
 Subcommittee on Communications and Technology (Chair)
 Subcommittee on Energy, Climate, and Grid Security
 Subcommittee on Health
 Select Committee on the Modernization of Congress

Caucus memberships 
 Republican Study Committee
 Congressional Propane Caucus (Co-chair) 
 Congressional Sportsmen's Caucus (Co-chair)
 Congressional French Caucus (Co-chair)
 Congressional Rural Broadband Caucus (Co-chair)
 Congressional Natural Gas Caucus
 Congressional Constitution Caucus 
 House Baltic Caucus

Personal life
Latta is an avid sportsman and lifelong resident of Northwest Ohio. He and his wife, Marcia, live in Bowling Green and have two daughters. He is the son of former Congressman Del Latta and Rose Mary Kiene Latta and serves in the seat his father held in Congress from 1959 to 1989.

Electoral history

1998 
Latta ran in the Republican primary for a congressional seat in 1998. He lost by 27 votes to then Ohio State Senate president Paul Gillmor, who won the general election.

2007
After Gillmor's sudden death in September 2007, Latta ran again for the seat. He defeated State Senator Steve Buehrer, among other candidates, in the special primary. In the December 11 special general election, Latta defeated Democratic nominee Robin Weirauch, 57% to 43%. He was sworn in on December 13, 2007.

2010

Latta defeated Democratic nominee Caleb Finkenbiner and Libertarian nominee Brian L. Smith.

2012

Latta defeated Democratic nominee Angela Zimmann and Libertarian nominee Eric Eberly. He was endorsed by the United States Chamber of Commerce, the NFIB, the NRA and National Right to Life.

References

External links
 Congressman Bob Latta official U.S. House website
 Bob Latta for Congress
 
 
 

|-

1956 births
20th-century American politicians
21st-century American politicians
Bowling Green State University alumni
County commissioners in Ohio
Living people
Republican Party members of the Ohio House of Representatives
Ohio lawyers
Republican Party Ohio state senators
People from Bluffton, Ohio
People from Bowling Green, Ohio
University of Toledo College of Law alumni
Conservatism in the United States
Republican Party members of the United States House of Representatives from Ohio